Cirilo Tirado Rivera (born June 14, 1964 in Patillas, Puerto Rico) is a Puerto Rican politician and senator. He has been a member of the Senate of Puerto Rico since 2000.

Early years and studies
Cirilo Tirado was born on June 14, 1964 in Patillas, Puerto Rico to Quintina Rivera Montañez, a teacher, and Cirilo Tirado Delgado, an attorney, and former senator and representative.

He finished his studies in his hometown of Patillas, and then studied at the University of Puerto Rico at Cayey and Río Piedras. He finished his bachelor's degree in education, with a major in mathematics.

Political career

First years in the PPD
Cirilo Tirado was part of the Board of the Popular Democratic Party. In 1989, he was president of the Puerto Rican Autonomist Youth and then, administrator of the Industrial Commission of Puerto Rico.

District Senator: 2000–2008
At the 2000 general elections, Tirado was elected senator for the Guayama district. During that term, he presided over the Commissions of Agriculture, Natural Resources, and Energy; Commission of Government Integrity; and Joint Commission of the Comptroller's Special Reports.

In 2004, he was reelected for a second term as senator for Guayama.

At-large Senator: 2008–present
Tirado decided to run for senator at large in 2008. He was chosen during the primaries of his party, and at the 2008 general elections,  he was elected. During that term, he has been the speaker for his party on the Commissions of Treasury, Agriculture, Natural and Environmental Resources, Social Welfare, Western Region Development, and the Joint Commission of the Comptroller's Special Reports.

References

External links
Hon. Cirilo Tirado Rivera on SenadoPR

1964 births
Members of the Senate of Puerto Rico
People from Patillas, Puerto Rico
Living people
University of Puerto Rico alumni